Ernest Hawkins may refer to:

 Ernest Hawkins (priest) (1802–1868), English churchman, and mission administrator 
 Ernest Hawkins (coach) (1927–2018), head coach at East Texas State University
 Ernie Hawkins (born 1947), American blues artist